HMS H12 was a British H-class submarine built by Fore River Yard, Quincy, Massachusetts. She was laid down on an unknown date and commissioned in 1915.
HMS H12 along with HMS H11 and HMS H13 to HMS H20 were all built in America but were interned by the United States government until the United States entered World War I.
HMS H12 was sold in April 1920 in Dover.

Design

H12 was fitted with a  Hotchkiss quick-firing gun (6-pounder) and four  torpedo tubes. Its torpedo tubes were fitted to the bows and the submarine was loaded with eight  torpedoes. It is a Holland 602 type submarine but was designed to meet Royal Navy specifications. Its complement was twenty-two crew members.

References

Bibliography

 

British H-class submarines
Ships built in Quincy, Massachusetts
1915 ships
World War I submarines of the United Kingdom
Royal Navy ship names